John Phiri (born 3 May 1962, in Zimbabwe) is a Zimbabwean retired footballer.

References

External links
 

Living people
1962 births
Zimbabwean footballers
Zimbabwe international footballers
Association football defenders
Dynamos F.C. players
Sokół Pniewy players
Warta Poznań players
Zimbabwe Premier Soccer League players
Ekstraklasa players
South African Premier Division players
Zimbabwean expatriate footballers
Zimbabwean expatriate sportspeople in Poland
Zimbabwean expatriate sportspeople in South Africa
Expatriate footballers in Poland
Expatriate soccer players in South Africa